Gambusia quadruncus, known as the llanos mosquitofish, is a species of bony fish in the genus Gambusia, part of the family Poeciliidae, that lives in east-central Mexico. Sometimes coexisting with at least three similar species, it differs from its closest relative, Gambusia affinis, in several characteristics with plausible effects on reproductive isolation. "Combined analysis of mitochondrial and nuclear gene sequence data indicates reciprocal monophyly of the species and its sister species Gambusia affinis, with levels of genetic divergence suggesting the two species diverged from one another over a million years ago. The origin of Gambusia quadruncus may reflect a vicariant event associated with Pliocene orogenesis in the Tamaulipas Arch and a frontal section of the Sierra Madre Oriental (Lleran Mesas)."

References

quadruncus
Live-bearing fish
Freshwater fish of Mexico
Fish described in 2012